Sarat may refer to:

People
Sarat Chandra (disambiguation), the given names of several people
Austin Sarat (born 1947), American lawyer and academic
Sarat Kumar Rai or Kumar Saratkumar Rai (1876–1946), a member of the royal family of Dighapatia
Sarat Kumar Ghosh (1878-1962), an Indian civil servant
Sarat Kumar Kar (born 1939), an Indian politician

Other uses
Sharad, or Śarat or Sharat, the early autumn season in the Hindu calendar
Sarat, a protagonist in American War (novel)

See also
Sarratt (disambiguation)
Sarrat, a municipality in Ilocos Norte, Philippines